Vladimir Gennadiyevich Chagin (born 5 January 1970) is a Russian rally raid driver. He has won the Dakar Rally driving Kamaz trucks in 2000, 2002, 2003, 2004, 2006, 2010 and 2011, becoming the most successful single category pilot in the history of the tournament earning him the nickname "The Tsar of Dakar".

 he holds the following records:
 The most Dakar rally wins in the truck category with 7 (1 more than Karel Loprais)
 The second most Dakar rally stage wins in all categories with 63, 5 behind Stéphane Peterhansel
 The record for most stage wins in a single Dakar rally season in the truck category with 9 out of 14 in 2010.

Winner
Dakar Rally: 2000, 2002, 2003, 2004, 2006, 2010 and 2011
Desert Challenge: 1999, 2001, 2002, 2003, 2004, 2005
Baja Italia: 2000
Optic 2000 Tunisia: 2000, 2001
Master-Rally: 1995, 1996, 2000, 2002
Rally Orientale - Kappadokia: 2003, 2004
Baja Pearl: 2000
Kalmykia: 2000
The Quiet Don: 2003
Khazar Steppes: 2004, 2006

In top 3
Dakar Rally:  2009
Desert Challenge: 2000
''Baikonur - Moscow: 1997

Honours and awards
Order of Merit for the Fatherland 4th class
Order of Courage
Order of Honour
Order of Friendship
Order of the Badge of Honour (USSR)
Medal "In Commemoration of the 1000th Anniversary of Kazan"
Medal "For Valiant Labour" (Republic of Tatarstan)

Dakar Rally results

References

External links
 Vladimir Chagin's biography at the official site of the Kamaz-Master Team
 Vladimir Chagin's blog
 Kamaz Dakar site

1970 births
Living people
Sportspeople from Perm, Russia
Russian rally drivers
Off-road racing drivers
Dakar Rally drivers
Dakar Rally winning drivers
Rally raid truck drivers